Interstate 80/90  exists as a concurrency as:
 Indiana Toll Road, from Lake Station to the Ohio state line 
 Ohio Turnpike, from the Indiana state line to Elyria Township